Problepsidis is a monotypic moth genus in the family Drepanidae. Its only species, Problepsidis argyrialis, is found in India. The genus and species were described by George Hampson in 1895.

References

Drepaninae
Monotypic moth genera
Moths of Asia
Drepanidae genera